The 1983 FIBA Africa Championship for Women was the 8th FIBA Africa Championship for Women, played under the rules of FIBA, the world governing body for basketball, and the FIBA Africa thereof. The tournament was hosted by Angola from April 3 to 8, 1983, with the games played at the Pavilhão da Cidadela in Luanda.

Zaire ended the round-robin tournament with a 5–0 unbeaten record to win their first title  and qualify for the 1983 FIBA Women's World Championship.

Participating teams

Schedule

Final standings 

Zaire rosterBompoco Lomboto, Evoluko Bokele, Kamanga Kasala, Komichelo Kayumba, Lingenda Liyoko, Longanza Kamimbaya, Nguya Nakwete, Coach: Ngoie wa Ngoie

Awards

External links
Official Website

References

1983 FIBA Africa Championship for Women
1983 FIBA Africa Championship for Women
AfroBasket Women
International basketball competitions hosted by Angola